Swedes Flat may refer to:
Swedes Flat, California
Swedes Flat, South Australia, in Tatiara District Council